Immortal Waltz is a 1939 historical drama film directed by E. W. Emo and starring Paul Hörbiger, Dagny Servaes, and Maria Andergast.

It was shot at the Rosenhügel Studios in Vienna. The film's art direction was by Julius von Borsody. The film portrays the lives the Austrian composer Johann Strauss I and family. The film was made by Wien-Film, a Vienna-based company set up after Austria had been incorporated into Greater Germany following the 1938 Anschluss.

Plot
Johann Strauss I firmly established himself as the leader of a dance band in Vienna in the 1840s. His sons Johann Strauss II and Josef obviously inherited their father's talent. Nevertheless, father Johann is strictly opposed to the two being trained as composers by concertmaster Amon, a good friend of his. Johann II and Josef attend the Vienna Polytechnic under paternal pressure, but Johann junior soon abandons his studies, which makes Johann angry at his son. Johann Strauss junior then goes his own way and breaks off contact with his family. Few years later, Johann Strauss' son has finally made it and is celebrated by the public as the new king of waltz. Father Johann, who is satisfied with his son's accomplishment, decides not to speak to his highly talented son in person. But soon after it, at the age of 44, Johann falls seriously ill with scarlet fever and dies, without speaking to his son.

Meanwhile, Josef has finished his studies at the Polytechnic and begins to work as an engineer, while still practicing music, he composes every time he have a free minute. Although his father has since passed away, Josef, unlike his brother Johann, does not dare to rebel against his father's wish. Through his wife Lina, Johann junior learns about the conflict in which Josef entangled himself in. He gives Josef an opportunity to prove his musical skills for the first time at a New Year's Eve celebration. Josef's premiere is a great success, and he is finally completely committed to music and ends his engineering career.

Josef had such a great success that he asks Johann to represent him on one of the other occasions. Meantime, the youngest of the three brothers, Eduard Strauss, has also grown up and also shows ambition as a composer. However, he and Joseph are under the shadow of the much famous brother, against whom they shall compete. Eventually, it is old Amon who creates a group, called "Strauss", in which all three Strausses are performing and inspiring the masses with their waltz music.

Cast

References

External links

Films of Nazi Germany
German biographical films
1930s biographical films
Films directed by E. W. Emo
Films set in the 19th century
Films set in Vienna
Films about classical music and musicians
Films about composers
Cultural depictions of Johann Strauss I
Cultural depictions of Johann Strauss II
Tobis Film films
1930s historical musical films
German historical musical films
German black-and-white films
Films set in the Austrian Empire
Films set in Austria-Hungary
Films shot at Rosenhügel Studios
1930s German films
1930s German-language films